Stingray Retro is a Canadian English language discretionary specialty channel owned by the Stingray Group. The channel broadcasts music videos mainly from the 1970s to the early 2010s, with some music videos from the 1960s being played occasionally as well.

History
In November 2000, CHUM Limited was granted approval from the Canadian Radio-television and Telecommunications Commission (CRTC) to launch a national English language Category 2 specialty television service called MuchMore ClassicVideo, described as "consisting of classic (songs more than five years old) music videos and related programs, including music and pop news or commentaries, interviews, concerts, profiles and specials, as well as music-related feature films and series or programs."

The channel was launched on September 4, 2003 as a commercial-free service under the name MuchMoreRetro, a spin-off of MuchMoreMusic (which is owned by CHUM at the time).

In July 2006, Bell Globemedia (later called CTVglobemedia) announced that it would purchase CHUM for an estimated $1.7 billion CAD, included in the sale was MuchMoreRetro. The sale was subject to CRTC approval and was approved in June 2007, with the transaction completed on June 22, 2007.

After the channel's initial launch in 2003, it began to introduce commercials throughout its schedule until August 31, 2009 when the channel, along with the other CTVglobemedia-owned digital music channels, switched back to a commercial-free format, while the analogue cable music channels continue to run commercials during programs to this day.

On September 10, 2010, BCE (a minority shareholder in CTVglobemedia) announced that it planned to acquire 100% interest in CTVglobemedia for a total debt and equity transaction cost of $3.2 billion CAD. The deal which required CRTC approval, was approved on March 7, 2011 and closed on April 1 of that year, on which CTVglobemedia was rebranded Bell Media.

On November 1, 2013, after MuchMore was rebranded as M3 in September of that year, MuchMoreRetro was rebranded as MuchRetro—aligning itself with MuchMusic for the first time.

On June 21, 2016, it was announced that Stingray Digital would acquire MuchRetro and its sister networks from Bell Media. The acquisition closed on September 16, 2016 with a plan to rebrand the channel as Stingray Retro. On June 1, 2017, Stingray announced the completion of the rebranding process for all 4 channels (MuchRetro was rebranded Stingray Retro prior to June 1), which included new programming and a national promotional campaign. Sometime in 2019, the channel switched back to an ad-supported service again, this time to match some of Stingray's radio stations with the matching format.

The first 10 music videos to air on the channel 
 1. Glass Tiger - "Don't Forget Me (When I'm Gone)" (1986)
 2. Duran Duran - "The Reflex" (1983)
 3. Madonna - "Like a Prayer" (1989)
 4. Michael Jackson - "Beat It" (1982)
 5. Prince & The Revolution - "Kiss" (1986)
 6. Cyndi Lauper - "Girls Just Want To Have Fun" (1983)
 7. Corey Hart - "Sunglasses at Night" (1983)
 8. Bryan Adams - "Summer of '69" (1984)
 9. U2 - "Where the Streets Have No Name" (1987)
 10. Bon Jovi - "Livin' on a Prayer" (1986)

Programming

Current
 90s Pop on Top
 Can't Top This
 Daily Video Hits
 Morning Flashback
 My First Video
 One-Hit Wonders
 Please Rewind
 Popcorn Time
 Reloaded Club Hits
 Retro Through Time
 Retro Weekend
 The Iconics

Former
 Cheesiest Videos
 Retro Concerts
 Retro @ The Movies

References

External links 
Official site
Channel description

Stingray Group
Commercial-free television networks
Music video networks in Canada
Television channels and stations established in 2003
Digital cable television networks in Canada
English-language television stations in Canada